Carlos Martín Volante (November 11, 1905 – October 9, 1987) was an Argentine football defensive midfielder, who played in Argentine, Brazilian, French and Italian clubs.

Career
Volante begun his youth career at small clubs in Lanús. In 1923, he signed Club Atlético Lanús, where he started his senior career on the following year. He would still serve in the military and then have a brief stint at Club Atlético General San Martín before joining Platense. In 1929 he transferred to San Lorenzo, with which he reached the semifinals of the local league. Between 1930 and 1931, Volante was loaned for free to Vélez Sársfield to play in the team's Pan-American tour.
Thereafter, he played four games in Excursionistas
Two years later he signed a deal with Napoli. He also played for Livorno and Torino in Italy, where he would stay until 1934 when he moved to French football.

Once there, Volante took part in the historical Rennes 1934-35 squad and also played for Olympique Lillois and CA Paris. During 1938 FIFA World Cup, held in France, he was hired by Brazil National Football Team to work as a massagist. The fear from World War II and a nice relationship built with Brazilian players made Volante transfer to Flamengo, where he would side with Brazilian stars Domingos da Guia and Leonidas. His defensive prowess led the defensive midfielder position to be called "volante" in Brazil.

Volante retired in 1943 to start a coaching career. He won the 1959 Taça Brasil for Bahia.

Honours

Club
Livorno
Serie B: 1933

Rennes
Coupe de France: Runners-up 1935

Olympique Lillois
Championnat de France: Runners-up 1936

Flamengo
Campeonato Carioca: 1939, 1942, 1943

Bahia
Campeonato Brasileiro (as manager): 1959

References

External links

1905 births
1987 deaths
Sportspeople from Lanús
Argentine footballers
Club Atlético Platense footballers
San Lorenzo de Almagro footballers
Club Atlético Vélez Sarsfield footballers
S.S.C. Napoli players
U.S. Livorno 1915 players
Torino F.C. players
Olympique Lillois players
Serie A players
Serie B players
Ligue 1 players
CR Flamengo footballers
Argentine expatriate footballers
Expatriate footballers in Brazil
Expatriate footballers in France
Expatriate footballers in Italy
Argentine expatriate sportspeople in Brazil
Argentine expatriate sportspeople in France
Argentine expatriate sportspeople in Italy
Argentine football managers
Expatriate football managers in Brazil
Sport Club Internacional managers
Esporte Clube Vitória managers
Esporte Clube Bahia managers
Campeonato Brasileiro Série A managers
Association football midfielders